Henry Newton Rowell Jackman  (born June 10, 1932) is a Canadian billionaire businessman who served as the 25th Lieutenant Governor of Ontario from 1991 to 1997. He is the son of former Member of Parliament Harry Jackman and philanthropist Mary Rowell Jackman. His mother was the daughter of another former Member of Parliament, Newton Rowell. His sister, Nancy Ruth, is a philanthropist who was appointed to the Senate in 2005.

Life and career
Jackman was educated at Pickering College, the University of Toronto Schools, Upper Canada College (where he was a member of Jackson's House), the University of Toronto Faculty of Law, and the London School of Economics.

He was the chairman of the board of National Trust Company and  The Empire Life Insurance Company, plus several other prominent Canadian corporations. In 1964, he married Maruja Trinidad Duncan.

Jackman was the Progressive Conservative candidate in the Toronto riding of Rosedale, which had been previously held by his father, in the 1963, 1965 and 1974 Canadian federal elections. He lost on all three occasions to Liberal Donald Stovel Macdonald.

Jackman was a longtime fundraiser for the Progressive Conservatives, and he became a supporter of the Canadian Alliance when it was formed prior to the 2000 election. He was also an advocate of the Unite the Right movement, which resulted in the creation of the Conservative Party of Canada.

Viceregal appointment
Jackman was appointed as Lieutenant Governor of Ontario by Governor General Ray Hnatyshyn in 1991, on the advice of Prime Minister Brian Mulroney, and he became a Member of the Order of Canada the same year. He focused on support for the arts, history and national unity during his time in office.

He served as Lieutenant Governor until 1997 and was then appointed to the Order of Ontario in 1998. He was promoted to Officer in the Order of Canada in the year 2000.

Other distinctions
Jackman did not serve in the military, but he received the Canadian Forces' Decoration in recognition of his service as an honorary colonel of the Governor General's Horse Guards, a Toronto militia unit.

He was named chancellor of the University of Toronto in 1997. Following his retirement from that post, he was elected as the fourth Visitor of Massey College.

Coat of arms

References

External links
Order of Canada Citation

1932 births
Living people
Alumni of the London School of Economics
Businesspeople from Toronto
Chancellors of the University of Toronto
Lieutenant Governors of Ontario
Members of the Order of Ontario
Members of the United Church of Canada
Officers of the Order of Canada
University of Toronto alumni
Upper Canada College alumni
Progressive Conservative Party of Canada candidates for the Canadian House of Commons